Water polo was contested for men only at the 1978 Asian Games in Kasetsart University, Bangkok, Thailand from 12 December 1978 to 17 December 1978.

Seven countries participated in the men's competition, China won the gold medal in the round robin competition, Japan and Singapore finished second and third behind China.

Medalists

Results

Final standing

References
 Asian Games water polo medalists

External links
 Results

 
1978 Asian Games events
1978
Asian Games
1978 Asian Games